The 1st Royal Bavarian Uhlans "Emperor William II, King of Prussia" (Königlich Bayerisches Ulanen-Regiment „Kaiser Wilhelm II., König von Preußen“ Nr. 1) was a light cavalry regiment of the Royal Bavarian Army. The regiment was formed in 1863 as a Uhlans unit. It fought in the Austro-Prussian War, the Franco-Prussian War and World War I. In 1919 the regiment was disbanded.

See also
List of Imperial German cavalry regiments

References

Cavalry regiments of the Bavarian Army
Regiments of the German Army in World War I
Military units and formations established in 1863
Military units and formations disestablished in 1919
1863 establishments in Bavaria
1919 disestablishments in Germany